The 2010 college football season may refer to:

 2010 NCAA Division I FBS football season
 2010 NCAA Division I FCS football season
 2010 NCAA Division II football season
 2010 NCAA Division III football season
 2010 NAIA Football National Championship